The 20th Robert Awards ceremony was held on 2 February 2003 in Copenhagen, Denmark. Organized by the Danish Film Academy, the awards honoured the best in Danish and foreign film of 2002.

Honorees

Best Danish Film 
 Open Hearts – Susanne Bier

Best Children's Film 
 Klatretøsen – Hans Fabian Wullenweber

Best Director 
 Nils Malmros – Facing the Truth

Best Screenplay 
 Nils Malmros & John Mogensen – Facing the Truth

Best Actor in a Leading Role 
 Jens Albinus – Facing the Truth

Best Actress in a Leading Role 
 Paprika Steen – Okay

Best Actor in a Supporting Role 
 Nikolaj Lie Kaas – Open Hearts

Best Actress in a Supporting Role 
 Paprika Steen – Open Hearts

Best Cinematography 
 Dan Laustsen – I Am Dina

Production Design 
 Steffen Aarfing & Marie í Dali – I Am Dina

Best Costume Design 
 Dominique Borg – I Am Dina

Makeup 
 June Pålgard & Elisabeth Bukkehave – I Am Dina

Best Special Effects 
 Jonas Wagner, Morten Lynge, Niels Valentin Dal & Hummer Højmark – Klatretøsen

Best Sound Design 
 Michael Dela & Nino Jacobsen – I Am Dina

Best Editing 
 Pernille Bech Christensen & Thomas Krag – Open Hearts

Best Score 
 Halfdan E. – Okay

Best Song 
 Nikolaj Steen – Okay

Best Documentary Short 
 Palle Nielsen – Mig skal intet Fattes – Jytte Rex

Best Documentary Feature 
 Angels of Brooklyn – Camilla Hjelm Knudsen & Martin Zandvliet

Best Short Featurette 
 Habibti – Min elskede – Pernille Fischer Christensen

Best Long Featurette 
 Begravelsen – Pia Bovin

Best Non-American Film 
 Amélie – Jean-Pierre Jeunet

Best American Film 
 Gosford Park – Robert Altman

Audience Award 
 Open Hearts

See also 

 2003 Bodil Awards

References

External links 
  

2002 film awards
Robert Awards ceremonies
2003 in Copenhagen